Telephone is a softphone for macOS developed by 64 Characters. It uses Session Initiation Protocol for communication. Telephone is distributed as free software under the GPL-3.0-or-later license.

Audio codecs 
 Speex/8000 (narrowband), Speex/16000 (wideband), and Speex/32000 (ultra-wideband)
 Opus
 G.711 family codec (PCMA, PCMU)
 G.722
 iLBC
 GSM

References

External links 
 Telephone website
 Telephone FAQ

Free software programmed in Objective-C
Free VoIP software
MacOS-only free software